The 1966 ISF Men's World Championship was an international softball tournament and the inaugural World Championship. The tournament was held in Mexico City, Mexico from 23 October to 1 November 1966. Eleven nations competed.

Final standings

References

ISF Men's World Championship
1966 ISF Men's World Championship
Men's Softball World Championship
Sports competitions in Mexico City
1960s in Mexico City